

See also
 SI
 Speed of light
 List of electromagnetism equations

References

External links 

 History of the electrical units.

Electromagnetism
Lists of units of measurement